Senate elections were held in Liberia on 8 December 2020, with half the seats in the Senate up for election. the elections were held concurrently with a constitutional referendum.

Results

Disputes
Nathaniel Blama of the Liberian National Union (LINU) called for a rerun in the election held in Gbarpolu and Grand Kru counties because of tampering with ballots.

The Collaborating Political Parties (CPP) called for a rerun of the election in the Nimba County based on allegations of fraud.

References

Senate election
Elections in Liberia
Liberia
Liberian Senate election